Barbashi is a rural locality (a khutor) in Svetloyarsky District, Volgograd Oblast, Russia. The population was 33 as of 2010.

Geography 
Barbashi is located 94 km northwest of Svetly Yar (the district's administrative centre) by road. Svetly Yar is the nearest rural locality.

References 

Rural localities in Svetloyarsky District